Vivian Raphael Eli (born 13 July 1938) is a former Dominican cricketer who played for the Windward Islands in West Indian domestic cricket. A right-arm pace bowler, he was the first Dominican to play first-class cricket.

In December 1959, aged 21, Eli was selected to represent the Windward Islands against England, in what was the team's inaugural first-class match. The only Dominican selected for the match, he scored no runs and took no wickets, bowling third behind Frank Mason and Theo Redhead in each innings. Eli never again played at first-class level.

References

External links
Player profile and statistics at CricketArchive
Player profile and statistics at ESPNcricinfo

1938 births
Living people
Dominica cricketers
People from Roseau
Windward Islands cricketers